Bermuda has competed at the IAAF World Athletics Championships on thirteen occasions, and did not send a delegation from 2003 to 2007. Its competing country code is BER. The country has won one silver medal at the competition, through Brian Wellman's performance at the 1995 World Championships in Athletics men's triple jump. Bermudan athletes have placed in the top eight of an event on six occasions.

Medals by World Championships

References 

 
Bermuda
World Championships in Athletics